Antonio Savo de' Panicoli (1629–1687) was a Roman Catholic prelate who served as Bishop of Termoli (1677–1687).

Biography
Antonio Savo de' Panicoli was born in Rome, Italy in 1629 and ordained a priest on 7 June 1659.
On 20 December 1677, he was appointed during the papacy of Pope Innocent XI as Bishop of Termoli.
On 2 January 1678, he was consecrated bishop by Gasparo Carpegna, Cardinal-Priest of San Silvestro in Capite, with Giacomo de Angelis, Archbishop Emeritus of Urbino, and Giacomo Buoni, Bishop of Montefeltro, serving as co-consecrators. 
He served as Bishop of Termoli until his death in November 1687.

Episcopal succession
While bishop, he was the principal co-consecrator of:
Tommaso Guzzoni, Bishop of Sora (1681); and 
Andrea Brancaccio, Bishop of Conversano (1681).

References

External links and additional sources
 (Chronology of Bishops) 
 (Chronology of Bishops) 

17th-century Italian Roman Catholic bishops
Bishops appointed by Pope Innocent XI
1629 births
1687 deaths